Mesa Verde National Park is a national park in Montezuma County, Colorado, U.S.

Mesa Verde (which means "green table" in English) may also refer to:

Mesa Verde, California, a census-designated place in Riverside County
Mesa Verde (Costa Mesa), a neighborhood of Costa Mesa, California
Mesa Verde Middle School (Moorpark), a middle school in Moorpark, California
Mesa Verde Middle School (Rancho Peñasquitos), a middle school in Rancho Peñasquitos, San Diego, California
Mesa Verde High School, a high school in Citrus Heights, California
Mesa Verde region, a portion of the Colorado plateau to the north of the San Juan river
Mesa Verde cactus